is a Japanese tarento and fashion model who is represented by the talent agency Twin Planet. She was a model for the fashion magazine Popteen.

In 2018, she was a contestant on Season 1 of Amazon Prime's Hitoshi Matsumoto presents Freeze, where eight entertainers are competing for 1 million yen, where they sit in a small room where they must endure and not react to various mechanisms by Downtown's Hitoshi Matsumoto.

Filmography

TV series

Magazines

Radio series

Advertisements

Music videos

Enterprise collaborations
Nana Suzuki × Prisila Collaboration Wig
Moonstar × Nana Suzuki Collaboration Shoes
Nana Suzuki Collaboration Nail Wrap

Awards

References

External links
 Official profile 
  

Japanese female models
Japanese television personalities
1988 births
Living people
Models from Ibaraki Prefecture